Dragiša Drobnjak (born 5 November 1977) is a Slovenian professional basketball coach and former player.

Honors and awards

Krka Novo Mesto 
3x Slovenian League Champion: (2000, 2003, 2011)
 EuroChallenge Champion: (2011)
 Slovenian Supercup : (2010)

Olimpija 
2x Slovenian League Champion: (2005, 2006)
2x Slovenian Cup Champion: (2005, 2006)
 Slovenian Supercup : (2013)

Oostende 
2x Belgian League Champion: (2012, 2013)
2x Belgian Cup Champion: (2010, 2013)

Šentjur 
 Slovenian League Champion: (2015)
 Slovenian Supercup : (2015)

Individual 
 4x Slovenian League All-Star: (2001, 2004, 2005, 2015, 2016)
 Slovenian League Finals MVP: (2015)

References

External links
Player Profile at Eurobasket.com

1977 births
Living people
ABA League players
Alba Berlin players
BC Oostende players
KK Krka players
KK Šentjur players
KK Olimpija players
KK Cedevita Olimpija assistant coaches
Sportspeople from Kranj
Slovenian basketball coaches
Slovenian men's basketball players
Slovenian people of Serbian descent
Turów Zgorzelec players
Power forwards (basketball)